Orfilea is a plant genus of the family Euphorbiaceae first described as a genus in 1858. It is native to Madagascar and other islands in the Indian Ocean.

Species
 Orfilea ankafinensis  (Baill.) Radcl.-Sm. & Govaerts - W Madagascar
 Orfilea coriacea Baill. - Comoros, Madagascar
 Orfilea multispicata (Baill.) G.L.Webster - Madagascar
 Orfilea neraudiana (Baill.) G.L.Webster - Mauritius

References

Alchorneae
Euphorbiaceae genera
Taxa named by Henri Ernest Baillon